Ligidium lapetum is a species of rock slater in the family Ligiidae. It is found in North America.

References

Woodlice
Articles created by Qbugbot
Crustaceans described in 1942